Nationality words link to articles with information on the nation's poetry or literature (for instance, Irish or France).

Events
January 23 – English poet John Donne becomes an ordained minister in the Church of England.

Works published

Great Britain
 John Andrewes, The Anatomie of Basenesse; or, The Foure Quarters of a Knave
 Richard Brathwaite, published under the name "Misosukos" to his friend "Philokrates", A Strappado for the Divell
 George Chapman, Twenty-four Bookes of Homers Odisses, publication year uncertain, Books 1–12 from Homers Odysses 1614 (see also Seaven Bookes of the Iliades of Homer 1598, Homer Prince of Poets 1609, The Iliads of Homer 1611, The Whole Workes of Homer 1616)
 Thomas Collins, The Teares of Love; or, Cupids Progresse
 Samuel Daniel, 
 Sir John Harrington, Epigrams Both Pleasant and Serious (see also The Most Elegant and Witty Epigrams 1618)
 Samuel Rowlands, Melancholie Knight
 Thomas Scot, published this year although the book states "1616"; second part published 1616
 Joshua Sylvester, The Second Session of the Parliament of Vertues Reall, translations from Pierre Mathieu and Guillaume de Salluste du Bartas (see also The Parliament of Vertues Royal 1614)
 Robert Tofte, The Blazon of Jealousie, translated from Benedetto Varchi
 George Wither:
 Fidelia, published anonymously
 Shepherds Hunting

Other
 Théodore Agrippa d'Aubigné, Tragiques, set of poems on the persecution of the Huguenots

Births
Death years link to the corresponding "[year] in poetry" article:
 June or July – Salvator Rosa (died 1673), Italian painter and poet
 John Denham (died 1669), English poet
 Germain Habert (died 1654), French churchman and poet
 Robert Wild (died 1679), English clergyman and poet

Deaths
Birth years link to the corresponding "[year] in poetry" article:
 June 4 – Vavrinec Benedikt of Nedožery, also known as Laurentius Benedictus Nudozierinus (born 1555), Slovak
 September 1 – Étienne Pasquier (born 1529), French poet, humanist and historian
 date not known – Gabriel Lobo Lasso de la Vega (born 1555), Castilian Spanish poet, playwright and historian

See also

 Poetry
 16th century in poetry
 16th century in literature

Notes

17th-century poetry
Poetry